The 2006 Sony HD 500 was a NASCAR Nextel Cup Series stock car race held on September 3, 2006 at California Speedway in Fontana, California. Contested over 250 laps on the 2-mile (3.23 km) asphalt D-shaped oval, it was the twenty-fifth race of the 2006 NASCAR Nextel Cup Series season. Kasey Kahne of Evernham Motorsports won the race.

Background
The track's turns are banked from fourteen degrees, while the front stretch, the location of the finish line, is banked at eleven degrees. Unlike the front stretch, the backstraightaway is banked at three degrees.

Qualifying

Results

References 

Sony HD 500
Sony HD 500
NASCAR races at Auto Club Speedway
September 2006 sports events in the United States